Background Briefing may refer to:

 Background Briefing, an Australian broadcast on the Radio National network
 Background Briefing, an American broadcast hosted by Ian Masters on the Pacifica Radio network